Diceratura teheranica is a species of moth of the family Tortricidae. It is found in Darband, Iran.

References

Moths described in 1970
Cochylini